Poussi, Poussy or Boussy real name Safenaz Moustafa Adry (born 26 November 1953) is a Cairo-born Egyptian actress.

Filmography 
 Shey Min El Khouf (“ A Taste of Fear “, 1969) (Arabic: شيء من الخوف)  
Al Amaleqa (" The giants ", 1974)  
 Lyaly Lan Taaood (" Nights that will never return ", 1974)  
 Al Dahaya (" The victims ", 1975)  
 Sana Ola Hobb (" First year in love ", (1976)  
 Seqan Fel Wahl (1976)  
 Qwtta Ala Nar (" A cat on fire ", 1977)  
 Laenet Al Zaman ("The curse of time ", 1979)  
 Al Aasheqa ("The Lover", 1980) 
 Habibi Daeman ("My Eternal Love", 1980)
 Fottowat Boulak (1981). 
 Fettowat Al Gabal (1982). 
 Marzooka (1983), 
 Al Zammar (1984).
 Al Shaytan Youghanny (1984).
 Fettewwet Al Nas Al Ghalaba (1984).
 Seraa Al Ayyam (1985).
 Al Zeyara Al Akheera ("The last visit"), 1986)
 Saat Al Fazaa (1986).
 Al Amaleyya 42 (1987).
 Ragol Fe Fakh Al Nasaa (1987).
 Lebet Al Kobar (1987).
 Al Kammasha (1988).
 Zaman Hatem Zahran (1988).
 Shayateen Al Madina (1991).
 Ibn Al Gabal (1992).
 Leabet Al Entqam (1992).
 Karawana (1993).
 Al Aasheqan ("The Two Lovers" , 2000) 
 Al Lahazat Allaty Ekhtafet (2001).
"Ahla Lahtha" ( The best moment) 2021

Personal life 
Poussi was born in Shoubra, Cairo to Egyptian Parents. Her maternal grand mother was of distant Turkish descent.

She was married to the prominent Egyptian actor Nour El Sherief in 1972 and gave birth to two daughters, one of them was an actress too and appeared in several television series beside her father but did not continue into the same career. She and Nour El Sherief got divorced in 2006 and they then got remarried again in 2015.

References

External links 

 

Cairo University alumni
Actresses from Cairo
Egyptian television actresses
Egyptian stage actresses
Egyptian film actresses
Living people
1953 births